Mirjam Hooman-Kloppenburg (born 4 January 1966) is a former female table tennis player from Netherlands. She won three medals in singles, doubles, and team events in the Table Tennis European Championships at Stuttgart in 1992. She also achieved a third team place in the Table Tennis World Cup in 1994, and competed at three Olympic Games.

See also
 List of table tennis players

References

1966 births
Living people
Dutch female table tennis players
Olympic table tennis players of the Netherlands
Table tennis players at the 1988 Summer Olympics
Table tennis players at the 1992 Summer Olympics
Table tennis players at the 1996 Summer Olympics